Johan Harald Kylin (5 February 1879 – 16 December 1949) was a Swedish botanist specializing in phycology and a professor at Lund University. He was also editor of the Botaniska Notiser, a Swedish scientific periodical from 1922 to 1928.

Works 
 Die Gattungen der Rhodophyceen

References 

20th-century Swedish botanists
1879 births
1949 deaths